Poche is the French word for pocket. It can refer to:

People
 Colin Poche (born 1994), American baseball player
 Felix Pierre Poché (1836–1895), American justice of the Louisiana Supreme Court
 Fred Poché (born 1960), French philosopher
 Jared Poché (born 1994), American baseball player
 Miroslav Poche (born 1978), Czech politician
 Oswald Poche (1908–1962), German Nazi military figure, chief of the Gestapo
See also
 Mauricio Pochettino (born 1972), Argentinian former footballer and manager of Tottenham Hotspur

Places
 Poche Beach, in San Clemente, California
 Habère-Poche, a commune in south-eastern France

Other
 Amour de poche, a French comedy fantasy film from 1957
 Chat en poche, a comedy in three acts by Georges Feydeau from 1892
 Le Livre de Poche ("The Pocket Book"), a publishing brand name in France since 1953
 Pochette, French name for a kit violin
 Télé Poche ("Pocket TV"), a weekly television listings magazine in France since 1966